Kozan may refer to:

 Kozan, Adana in Turkey
 Kozan, Hiroshima in Japan
 Larnakas tis Lapithou, a village in Cyprus, whose Turkish name is Kozan